The Closet (Korean: 클로젯; RR: Keullojet) is a 2020 South Korean horror film written and directed by Kim Kwang-bin, starring Ha Jung-woo and Kim Nam-gil.

Plot
The film is about a man who grows apart from his daughter following the death of his wife, and an exorcist who helps the man and his daughter. After Sang-Won's daughter Yi-Na goes missing in their new home, a mysterious man approaches him and tells him to look for her in the closet.

Cast
Ha Jung-woo as Sang-won
Kim Nam-gil as Kyung-hoon
Heo Yool as Yi-na
Kim Si-A as Myung-jin
Shin Hyun-bin as Seung-hee
Kim Soo-jin as Myung-jin's mother
Park Sung-woong as Myung-jin's father
Park Ji-a as Shaman
Lim Hyun-sung as Junior Colleague
Kang Sin-cheol as Do-hyun
Han Chang-min as Evil Spirit 21

Production 
Principal photography began on September 17, 2018, and wrapped on November 29, 2018.

Notes

References

External links

Films about exorcism
CJ Entertainment films
South Korean supernatural horror films
2020s supernatural horror films
2020 films
2020s Korean-language films